Manola Saavedra (born Manuela Saavedra Moreno; 29 June 1936 – 25 August 2012) was a Spanish-born Mexican film and television actress, perhaps best known for her role in El bolero de Raquel (1957).

Selected filmography
El bolero de Raquel (1957) ... Raquel

References

External links

Mexican film actresses
Mexican telenovela actresses
Mexican television actresses
Golden Age of Mexican cinema
1936 births
2012 deaths
Spanish emigrants to Mexico
People from Valencia